Papadopoli is the Italian form of the common Greek name Papadopoulos. It may refer to:

 The , a Venetian patrician family with roots from Crete, which gave its name to all of the following :
 Palazzo Papadopoli, a Baroque palace in Venice
 , a palace in the Tolentini area of Venice, located next to the Giardini Papadopoli
 Giardini Papadopoli (litt. "Papadopoli Gardens"), a 19th-century park in Venice
 Niccolò Comneno Papadopoli (1655–1740), a Greek-Italian lawyer and historian
  (1802-1844), Venetian scholar and benefactor
  a.k.a. Nicolo Papadopoli Aldobrandini (1841-1922), Italian politician

See also
Papadopoulos, the most common Greek surname